Sílvio Vasconcelos da Silveira Ramos Romero (April 21, 1851 – June 18, 1914) was a Brazilian "Condorist" poet, essayist, literary critic, professor, journalist, historian and politician.

He founded and occupied the 17th chair of the Brazilian Academy of Letters from 1897 until his death in 1914.

Life
Romero was born in the city of Lagarto, in the State of Sergipe, in 1851, to André Ramos Romero, a Portuguese salesman, and Maria Joaquina Vasconcelos da Silveira. He graduated in Law at the Faculdade de Direito do Recife in 1873, and would work for many newspapers of Pernambuco and Rio during the 1870s.

In 1875, he was elected a provincial deputy for the city of Estância. His first poetry book, Cantos do Fim do Século, was published in 1878. In 1879 he moved to Rio de Janeiro and served as Philosophy teacher for the Colégio Pedro II between 1881 and 1910.

He died in 1914.

Works
 Cantos do Fim do Século (1878)
 Cantos Populares do Brasil (1883)
 Últimos Harpejos (1883)
 Contos Populares do Brasil (1885)
 Uma Esperteza (1887)
 Parnaso Sergipano (1889)
 Folclore Brasileiro (1897)

References 

Footnotes

Sources

External links
 
 Romero's biography at the official site of the Brazilian Academy of Letters 

1851 births
1914 deaths
Brazilian male poets
Romantic poets
Brazilian journalists
Brazilian people of Portuguese descent
Members of the Brazilian Academy of Letters
People from Sergipe
Collectors of fairy tales
19th-century Brazilian male writers
19th-century Brazilian poets
20th-century Brazilian male writers
20th-century Brazilian poets